The 2022–23 Naisten Liiga season is the fortieth season of the Naisten Liiga, the premier level of women's ice hockey in Finland, since the league's establishment as the  in 1982. The regular season began on 10 September 2022 and concluded on 19 February 2023.

Kiekko-Espoo were the reigning regular season champions from the 2021–22 season and also the reigning Finnish Champions as winners of the 2022 Aurora Borealis Cup playoffs.

League business

Season format
The Finnish Ice Hockey Association chose to streamline the Naisten Liiga season format after the 2021–22 season. Instead of the previous twenty-game preliminary series and ten-game divisional series, the ten teams play a single-series, four-cycle round-robin. For each team, the regular season comprises 36 games.

The top eight teams at the end of the season qualify for the Aurora Borealis Cup playoffs. The teams finishing the season ranked ninth and tenth play a promotion/relegation series against the top two teams of the Naisten Mestis.

The format change adds six games per team to the regular season schedule and matches the season structure of the league's closest neighbor, the Swedish Women's Hockey League (SDHL).

Offseason

Coaching changes

Player signings 
Note: This section does not record all player signings. It is limited to player movements involving national team players (from any country), international import players, and extra-league signings.

Pre-season

The 2022 Aurora Borealis Cup champions, Kiekko-Espoo, saw the single largest number of pre-season player departures, with a majority of departures involving Finnish national team players. Players from Kiekko-Espoo departing for other leagues included reigning Päivi Halonen Award winner and Playoff MVP Nelli Laitinen, who left to pursue a college ice hockey career with the Minnesota Golden Gophers; Ella Viitasuo and Kiira Yrjänen, who signed in the Swedish Women's Hockey League (SDHL) with HV71 Dam; and Minttu Tuominen, who began the 2021–22 season as captain of Kiekko-Espoo but concluded the season in the Zhenskaya Hockey League (ZhHL) with the KRS Vanke Rays and signed in the Premier Hockey Federation (PHF) with the Metropolitan Riveters for the 2022–23 season. Several high-impact Kiekko-Espoo players signed with other Naisten Liiga teams, including reigning Best Forward for four consecutive seasons Elisa Holopainen and All-Star Sanni Rantala, who both signed with KalPa; Emilia Vesa, who signed with HIFK; and Emmi Leinonen, who retired from playing and joined HPK as an assistant coach.

HPK celebrated the career of all-time Naisten Liiga top point scorer and most games played record holder Riikka Noronen, who retired from playing in 2022 after 27 consecutive seasons in the league. The vacancy left by Noronen’s departure and other player movements made it possible for HPK to attract a number of international players, including Olympic medalist in speed skating and Czech national team forward Karolína Erbanová, Czech national under-18 team forward Barbora Juříčková, and Slovak national team centre Lucia Záborská. French national team goaltender Margaux Mameri was signed to replace Canadian Kassidy Sauvé, who departed HPK to sign in the PHF with the Buffalo Beauts. Sauvé had signed in the middle of the 2021–22 season as successor to starting netminder Noora Räty, who left HPK in January to rejoin the KRS Vanke Rays in the ZhHL.

KalPa also bid farewell to a franchise star with the retirement of their captain, the 2020 Player of the Year winner and a three-time All-Star, Tanja Niskanen. In addition to signing national team players Holopainen and Rantala from Kiekko-Espoo, KalPa attracted Finnish goaltender Aino Laitinen from the Budapest Jégkorong Akadémia of the European Women's Hockey League (EWHL).

TPS boasted both the 2021–22 regular season top point scorer in French national team centre Estelle Duvin, and the player with the most regular season assists in Maija Otamo (three-way tied with Elisa Holopainen and Michaela Pejzlová). In a major loss to the team's offensive production, the linemates both signed in the Swiss Women's League (SWHL A) with EV Bomo Thun for the 2022–23 season. Continuing the pattern of signing at least one French national team player to the roster in each season since 2020, TPS inked defenseman Raphaëlle Grenier.

Ilves goaltender Anni Keisala was named 2022 Naisten Liiga Player of the Year and Best Goaltender – in addition to being named Best Goaltender of the 2021 IIHF Women's World Championship – making her a highly sought after addition to a number of international teams. Her decision to sign in the SDHL with HV71 was one of the most significant moves of the pre-season. Ilves recruited internationally to fill Keisala's roster spot and brought in Canadian goaltender Camille Scherger from the UPEI Panthers women's ice hockey program of U Sports. Top defenceman Anna Kilponen, who began the 2021–22 season as captain of Ilves before concluding the season in the ZhHL with the KRS Vanke Rays, opted not to return to Finland and instead signed in the PHF with the Metropolitan Riveters. 

Kiekko-Espoo’s Laitinen was not the only Naisten Liiga defenseman to embark on a college ice hockey career in the NCAA Division I, as Krista Parkkonen of HIFK, the 2020 Naisten Liiga Rookie of the Year and a two-time All-Star, joined the Vermont Catamounts women's ice hockey program. HIFK saw relatively little turnover in comparison to their close neighbors in Espoo, with the departure of just Parkkonen and Czech forward Veronika Lorencová, who left for the EVB Eagles Südtirol of the EWHL and Italian Hockey League Women. The team acquired two Finnish national team players: Sanni Vanhanen, the youngest active member of the national team and the top Finnish scorer at the 2022 IIHF U18 Women's World Championship, who had previously played with the Tappara boys' under-17 teams in Finland's top U17 league and had been loaned to Ilves Naiset for a handful of games over the previous several seasons, and Emilia Vesa, a standout winger and former captain of Team Kuortane, who had played with Kiekko-Espoo since 2020.

Teams

2022–23 season

Regular season 
The season began on 10 September 2022 and concluded on 19 February 2023.

Standings
HIFK Helsinki claimed first place in the regular season for the first time in team history. They tied KalPa Kuopio in points, with 93 points each, but HIFK were awarded top rank by virtue of a higher goal difference. Kiekko-Espoo, the first place team from the 2021–22 regular season, finished in third place with 74 points. HPK Hämeenlinna improved from seventh place (first in the lower division series) in the 2021–22 regular season to fourth in 2022–23, amassing 67 points. Though Tampereen Ilves outperformed their 1.43 points per game (Pts/G) average from 2021–22, with a 1.64 Pts/G, they moved down the rankings from fourth to fifth place, season over season. Team Kuortane finished in sixth place for the second consecutive season, however, like Ilves, they notably improved their points per game from 1.15 to 1.53, season over season. TPS Turku fell from fifth to seventh place and Oulun Kärpät suffered the most dramatic fall in the standings, going from third to eighth place.

Schedule

Player statistics

Scoring leaders

The following players led the league in points at the conclusion of the regular season on 19 February 2023. 

The following skaters were the top point scorers of teams not represented in the scoring leader table at the conclusion of the regular season on 19 February 2023, noted with their overall league scoring rank:

 25. Nea Tervonen (F), Kuortane: 33 GP, 12 G, 20 A, 32 Pts, 4 PIM
 39. Aliisa Toivonen (F), Lukko: 33 GP, 12 G, 12 A, 24 Pts, 28 PIM
 63. Iida Lappalainen (F), RoKi: 33 GP, 11 G, 6 A, 17 Pts, 26 PIM

Goaltenders
The following goaltenders had played at least one-third of their team's minutes in net at the conclusion of the regular season on 19 February 2023, sorted by save percentage.

Top backup goaltenders

The following goaltenders recorded the highest save percentages of those who had played a minimum of ten percent but fewer than one-third of their team’s minutes in net at the conclusion of the regular season on 19 February 2023.

Player movements

Loans

Playoffs

Qualification
The qualification series will begin on 18 March and conclude on 4 April 2023. The tournament will be played as a double round-robin in which each team will face every opponent once at home and once away.

Two teams from the 2022 qualification series returned to the promotion/relegation tournament in 2023: Lukko and RoKi. In the 2022 series, RoKi successfully defended their place in the league and Lukko earned promotion back to the Naisten Liiga after having been relegated to the Naisten Mestis in the 2021 Naisten Liiga qualifiction.

Lukko and RoKi will be joined by the top two teams of the Naisten Mestis regular season, HIFK Akatemia and Kiekko-Espoo Akatemia, the respective developmental squad of HIFK Naiset and Kiekko-Espoo Naiset, the Aurora Borealis Cup finalists. Both teams are making their debut in the Naisten Liiga qualification and the series will be the first in league history to feature the developmental squads of two teams active in the Naisten Liiga.

Standings

Results

Awards and honours

Finnish Ice Hockey Association awards 

 Marianne Ihalainen Award (Top point scorer): Michaela Pejzlová, HIFK
 Tiia Reima Award (Top goal scorer): Elisa Holopainen, KalPa
 Sari Fisk Award (Best plus/minus): Michaela Pejzlová, HIFK
 Student Athlete Award: Michaela Pejzlová, HIFK 
 U18 Student Athlete Award: Kerttu Lehmus, Team Kuortane

Player of the Month 
 September 2022: Emilia Kyrkkö (G), Team Kuortane
 October 2022: Julia Liikala (F), HIFK
 November 2022: Elisa Holopainen (F), KalPa
 December 2022: Kiti Seikkula (F), HPK
 January 2023: Emilia Vesa (F), HIFK
 February 2023: Pauliina Salonen (F), TPS

Notes

References

Game recaps

Naisten Liiga (ice hockey) seasons
Naisten Liiga
Naisten Liiga
Naisten Liiga